Jeffrey A. Albert (born October 31, 1980) is an American professional baseball coach, currently in the role of Director of Hitting for the New York Mets. He has previously coached in Major League Baseball (MLB) for the Houston Astros and St. Louis Cardinals.

Career
Albert graduated from Bishop Kearney High School in Rochester, New York. He attended Butler University, where he played baseball for the Bulldogs. After graduating in 2003, he signed with the Washington Wild Things of the Frontier League, an independent baseball league. Albert earned a master's degree in kinesiology from Louisiana Tech University in 2008.

Albert served as a hitting coach in the St. Louis Cardinals minor league system for five years, and then joined the Astros as their minor league hitting coordinator, a job he held for four years. After the 2017 season, the Astros promoted Albert to assistant hitting coach for the major league team, succeeding Alonzo Powell.

The St. Louis Cardinals hired Albert as their hitting coach after the 2018 season. Albert left the Cardinals after the 2022 season. In November 2022, Albert was hired by the New York Mets as their Director of Hitting.

References

External links

Living people
1980 births
Baseball coaches from New York (state)
Baseball infielders
Baseball players from New York (state)
Butler Bulldogs baseball players
Houston Astros coaches
Louisiana Tech University alumni
Major League Baseball hitting coaches
Minor league baseball coaches
St. Louis Cardinals coaches
Shreveport Sports players
Sportspeople from Rochester, New York
Washington Wild Things players